Sue Monroe is a British television presenter, actress, and author best known for hosting CBeebies, and playing Poppy in Playdays.

Career
Monroe presented, voiced and puppeteered Poppy the Cat in Playdays from 1990 to 1997. In February 2002, she became one of the first presenters on CBeebies, with Chris Jarvis, Sidney Sloane, and Pui Fan Lee. She voiced Tigs the Tiger in the CBeebies show The Shiny Show. In 2006, Monroe presented Wakey Wakey on GMTV.

Monroe now writes children's books, the series 'The Magnificent Moon Hare' and 'The Magnificent Moon Hare and the Foul Treasure' have been translated into five languages. Monroe owns a children's shop called P.J and The Hare (a nod to her books) based in Cuckfield, West Sussex. The latest book in the Moon Hare series is due to be published in 2020.

References

Year of birth missing (living people)
Living people
British television actresses
British television presenters
British women television presenters
Place of birth missing (living people)